The motorways in Thailand is an intercity toll controlled-access highways network that currently spans . It is to be greatly extended to  according to the master plan. Thailand's motorway network is considered to be separate from Thailand's expressway network, which is the system of expressways, usually elevated, within Greater Bangkok. Thailand also has a provincial highway network.

Overview

The Thai highway network spans over 70,000 kilometers across all regions of Thailand. These highways, however, are often dual carriageways with frequent U-turn lanes and intersections, thus slowing down traffic. Coupled with the increase in the number of vehicles and the demand for limited-access motorways, the Thai Government issued a cabinet resolution in 1997 detailing the motorway construction master plan.  Some upgraded sections of highway are being turned into "motorways", while other motorways are being purpose-built.

List of motorway routes in Thailand
List of motorway routes in Thailand that are operational, under construction, and planned according to the master plan in 2015.
  Motorway that are operational in full or partial part.
  Motorway that under construction, wholly or in part.

See also
Transport in Thailand
Rail transport in Thailand
Economy of Thailand

References

Transport in Thailand
Roads in Thailand
Controlled-access highways in Thailand